David McGill or MacGill may refer to:
David McGill (footballer) (born 1981), Irish footballer
David McGill (soccer) (born 1960), Canadian soccer player
David McGill (writer) (born 1942), New Zealand writer
David McGill (athlete) (born 1901), represented Canada at the 1924 Summer Olympics
David McGill (bowls), Scottish lawn and indoor bowler and commentator
David MacGill (died 1595), Lord Advocate of Scotland
David McGill (musician), American Grammy Award-winning bassoonist

See also
David Gill (disambiguation)